David Dickinson (born 1941) is an English antiques expert and television presenter.

David Dickinson may also refer to:

David T. Dickinson (1867–1930), Mayor of Cambridge, Massachusetts
David W. Dickinson (1808–1845), U.S. Representative from Tennessee
David Dickinson, author of the Lord Francis Powerscourt Mysteries series of novels
David Dickinson (academic), American scholar
David Dickinson (cricketer) (1929–1997), English cricketer

See also
Dave Dickenson (born 1973), Canadian football player